Jairus Keelon Byrd (born October 7, 1986) is a former American football free safety. He played college football for the University of Oregon. He was drafted by the Buffalo Bills in the second round of the 2009 NFL Draft. He is a three-time Pro Bowl selection.

Early years
Byrd attended Clayton High School in St. Louis County, Missouri. He played quarterback, wide receiver, safety and special teams. As a senior, he was the Missouri 4A offensive player of the year and played a large role in leading the school to the 2004 state championship. As a senior, he rushed for 1,480 yards with 26 touchdowns, passed for 1,038 yards with 13 touchdowns, and made six receptions for 125 yards on offense. On defense, he had 71 tackles, seven interceptions, three quarterback sacks and two fumble recoveries. He also had 10 kickoff returns, 15 punt returns, and 18 punts. He also lettered in basketball and track.

College career
Byrd enrolled in the University of Oregon, where he played for the Oregon Ducks football team. As a freshman in 2005, Byrd was red-shirted. In 2006 Byrd was a freshman All-American second-team selection by The Sporting News and was the Pac-10 co-freshman player of the year (alongside Taylor Mays and Alterraun Verner). He started the last 11 games at cornerback, recording 56 tackles and five interceptions.

As a sophomore in 2007 Byrd was an All-Pac-10 conference honorable mention. He started all 13 games for the Ducks, recording 64 tackles, a sack, and a conference leading seven interceptions. As a junior in 2008 he was an all-Pac 10 first-team selection and was the defensive MVP of the 2008 Holiday Bowl. He started 13 games and finished with 83 tackles and five interceptions.

Byrd finished his college career starting 37 of 39 games, with 203 tackles, 17 interceptions, a sack, two forced fumbles and four fumble recoveries.

After the season Byrd announced that he would forgo his senior season and enter the 2009 NFL Draft.

Professional career

Buffalo Bills
The Buffalo Bills selected Byrd in the second round (42nd overall) of the 2009 NFL Draft. Byrd was the third safety drafted in 2009, behind Patrick Chung and Louis Delmas.

On July 29, 2009, the Buffalo Bills signed Byrd to a four-year, $4.15 million contract that includes $2.47 million guaranteed.

After spending the first couple of games as a backup, Byrd started his first career game at free safety against the Miami Dolphins due to injuries to both the Bills starting safeties Donte Whitner and Bryan Scott. He finished the game with three tackles. In his second start the next week Byrd recorded his first career interception off of Derek Anderson of the Cleveland Browns. Starting for the third straight week, Byrd recorded two more interceptions off Mark Sanchez of the New York Jets bringing his total to three. The next week against the Carolina Panthers, Byrd had his second straight game of two interceptions, both of them coming off Jake Delhomme, bringing his total to five. For his play, he was named the NFL Defensive Rookie of the Month for October.

In Week 8 against the Houston Texans, Byrd recorded two interceptions for the third consecutive week, bringing his total to seven. This tied an NFL record held by Dave Baker for consecutive games with two or more interceptions with three. After the Bills bye week Byrd intercepted his eighth pass of the season off of Vince Young of the Tennessee Titans. This was his fifth straight game with an interception, setting the team record for consecutive games with an interception. He intercepted his ninth pass of the season off of Matt Cassel of the Kansas City Chiefs.

On December 23, 2009, Byrd was placed on season ending injured reserve. He finished the season starting 11 of 14 games, recording 45 tackles and nine interceptions. The nine interceptions were tied for the league lead and was five more than any other rookie had. For his play, he was selected to play in the Pro Bowl, becoming the first Bills rookie to be selected to play in a Pro Bowl since Greg Bell in 1984. However, he was unable to play and was replaced by Brandon Meriweather. He was also a member of the Sporting News all-rookie team.

On March 1, 2013, the Bills placed their franchise tag on Byrd after he was originally designated to become a free agent after the 2012 season. On August 20, 2013, Byrd signed his $6.9 million franchise tender. Despite signing the tender, reports were released that he wanted the Bills to trade him. Byrd's tenure with the Bills ended after the team and his agents failed to agree on a long-term deal following the 2013 season. In five seasons with Buffalo, Byrd intercepted 22 passes and forced 11 fumbles, also making three Pro Bowl appearances.

New Orleans Saints
On March 11, 2014, Byrd agreed to a six-year, $56 million contract including $28 million guaranteed with the New Orleans Saints.  Byrd played in the Saints' first 4 games of the 2014 season, but then suffered a torn lateral meniscus knee ligament during practice on October 2, 2014; the following day, the team announced Byrd would be placed on season-ending injured reserve.

On March 10, 2017, Byrd was released by the Saints.

Carolina Panthers
On October 3, 2017, Byrd was signed by the Carolina Panthers.

NFL statistics

Personal life
His father, Gill Byrd, played in the National Football League for the San Diego Chargers from 1983 to 1992, and was the defensive backs coach for the Buffalo Bills for the 2017-18 season. He is currently the passing game coordinator/safeties coach at the University of Illinois.

Byrd is cousins with Richard Rodgers. His uncle is Richard Rodgers Sr.

Byrd is a Christian. He also sponsors two children through Compassion International.

References

External links
Official website
New Orleans Saints bio
Buffalo Bills bio
Oregon Ducks bio

1986 births
Living people
Players of American football from San Diego
American football cornerbacks
American football safeties
Oregon Ducks football players
Buffalo Bills players
New Orleans Saints players
Carolina Panthers players
American Conference Pro Bowl players
Unconferenced Pro Bowl players
Ed Block Courage Award recipients